Justin Bolli (born March 18, 1976) is an American professional golfer. who has played on the PGA Tour and the Web.com Tour.

Bolli was born in Portland, Oregon. 

Bolli started playing on the Nationwide Tour (now Web.com Tour) full-time in 2004 and moved up to the PGA Tour in 2005. In his rookie season on the PGA Tour, he only made 9 of 24 cuts with his best finish being tied for 17th at the Southern Farm Bureau Classic. He moved back to the Nationwide Tour in 2006. He finished in 8th place on the Nationwide Tour's money list in 2007 to earn his PGA Tour card for 2008. He was not able to retain his PGA Tour card in 2008 and returned to the Nationwide Tour in 2009. He won the Price Cutter Charity Championship in August 2009, his third victory on the Nationwide Tour. He finished 11th on the money list to earn his 2010 PGA Tour card.

Bolli lost his Tour card in 2010 after only making 4 cuts in 23 events. He played on the Web.com Tour for two years and was 44th on the 2012 money list going into the season finale. Bolli won the final event, moved up to ninth, and regained a PGA Tour card.

Professional wins (5)

Web.com Tour wins (4)

Web.com Tour playoff record (0–1)

Other (1)
2003 Georgia Open

See also
2004 Nationwide Tour graduates
2007 Nationwide Tour graduates
2009 Nationwide Tour graduates
2012 Web.com Tour graduates
List of golfers with most Web.com Tour wins

External links

American male golfers
Georgia Bulldogs men's golfers
PGA Tour golfers
Korn Ferry Tour graduates
Golfers from Portland, Oregon
People from Simpsonville, South Carolina
1976 births
Living people